Hubert Collins (born August 19, 1936) is an American politician from Kentucky, where he also has been elected to public office.

Collins has served in the Kentucky House of Representatives since 1991, representing district 97, as a Democrat. A former teacher, auctioneer, car dealer and broker, he attended Morehead State University.

References

1936 births
Living people
People from Johnson County, Kentucky
Morehead State University alumni
Businesspeople from Kentucky
Democratic Party members of the Kentucky House of Representatives
21st-century American politicians